Kasadya Ning Taknaa is a Cebuano Christmas carol composed in 1933 by Vicente Rubi with lyrics by Mariano Vestil. Its famous counterpart is Ang Pasko Ay Sumapit, a modified version of the song written by Levi Celerio with lyrics in Tagalog (but not as a translation of the original); however, Celerio is often given all songwriting credit without any acknowledgment of Rubi and Vestil.

Lyrics
Preface:
Kasadya ning taknaa
Dapit sa kahimayaan
Maoy among nakita
Ang panagway masanagon
Bulahan ug bulahan
Ang tagbalay nga gi-awitan
Awit nga halandumon sa tanang Pasko
Magmalipayon!

Chorus:
Bag-ong tuig
Bag-ong kinabuhi
Duyogan ta sa atong gibati
Atong awiton aron sa kalipay                                                                                                                                                                                                          
kitang makaangkon

Chorus
Preface
Coda
Awit nga halangdumon sa tanang Pasko
Magmalipayon!

References

Cebuano music
Christmas carols
Philippine songs